Standard Romanization is a romanization system for Cantonese developed by Christian missionaries in South China in 1888, particularly relying upon the work of John Morrison Chalmers. By 1914, it had become well established in Canton and Hong Kong (there being no other system of significance in published literature) and publications using it having been issued by the British and Foreign Bible Society, the China Baptist Publication Society, and the Pakhoi Mission Press from as early as 1906.  It is the foundation of the current system of Romanisation used by the Hong Kong Government.

Initials

Finals 

 The finals m and ng can only be used as standalone nasal syllables.
When h or k is an initial, om and op are used as the final, instead of am and ap.
When s, ts or ts’ is the initial, and i is the final, the final is written z instead.
When y is an initial, and i, iu, in, ip, it, or iu are used as finals, the y is omitted, resulting in i, iu, in, ip, it, and iu, but yik, and ying.
When y is an initial, and ue, uen, or uet are finals, the y is omitted.
When w is an initial, and oo, ooi, or oon are finals, the w is omitted.
When i is an initial ending with ue begins a rime
Unlike most modern Cantonese romanization systems, a distinction is made between 卅 and 沙. The former is represented by sa while the latter is written as sha.

Tones
Tones are indicated using diacritic marks.

References

Cantonese romanisation